Lakefield Township is the name of some places in the U.S. state of Michigan:

 Lakefield Township, Luce County, Michigan
 Lakefield Township, Saginaw County, Michigan

Michigan township disambiguation pages